Kristian Ruslanovych Bilovar (born 5 February 2001) is a Ukrainian professional footballer who plays as a defender for AEL Limassol, on loan from Dynamo Kyiv.

Club career

Dynamo Kyiv
Kristian Bilovar is a youth product of Dynamo Kyiv, winning the Ukrainian Under-19 League in 2019 and in 2020 before signing a professional contract ahead of the |2020–21 season.

Loan to Desna Chernihiv
In July 2021 he moved on loan to Desna Chernihiv in the Ukrainian Premier League. On 25 July he made his league debut at home against Chornomorets Odesa at the Chernihiv Stadium, replacing Levan Arveladze in the 87th minute.

Loan to Chornomorets Odesa
On 3 September 2021 he moved on loan to Chornomorets Odesa. On 23 September he played in the Ukrainian Cup against Prykarpattia Ivano-Frankivsk, seeing Odesa through to the round of 16.

Loan to AEL Limassol
In August 2022 he moved on loan to AEL Limassol in the Cypriot First Division for the 2022–23 season.

Career statistics

Club

References

External links
 Profile on Official website of FC Desna Chernihiv
 

2001 births
Living people
Sportspeople from Debrecen
FC Dynamo Kyiv players
FC Desna Chernihiv players
FC Chornomorets Odesa players
AEL Limassol players
Ukrainian Premier League players
Cypriot First Division players
Association football defenders
Ukrainian footballers
Ukraine youth international footballers
Expatriate footballers in Cyprus
Ukrainian expatriate sportspeople in Cyprus